Seventeen (stylized in all caps or as SVT) is a South Korean boy band formed by Pledis Entertainment. The group consists of thirteen members: S.Coups, Jeonghan, Joshua, Jun, Hoshi, Wonwoo, Woozi, DK, Mingyu, The8, Seungkwan, Vernon, and Dino.

The group debuted on May 26, 2015, with the extended play (EP) 17 Carat, which became the longest-charting K-pop album of the year in the US and the only rookie album to appear on Billboard's "10 Best K-Pop Albums of 2015" list. Seventeen has released four studio albums, twelve EPs and three reissues.

Seventeen is considered a "self-producing" idol group, with the members actively involved in songwriting and choreographing, among other aspects of their music and performances. They perform as one group and are divided into three units—hip-hop, vocal, and performance—each with a different area of specialization. They have been labeled "Performance Kings", "Theater Kids of K-Pop", and "K-Pop Performance Powerhouse'" by various domestic and international media outlets.

Name
The name Seventeen is derived from the expression "13 members + 3 units + 1 group", representing how the 13 members are divided into three different units and come together to form one cohesive group.

History

2013–2015: Formation, Seventeen TV, and Seventeen Project

Beginning in 2013, Seventeen appeared in regular live broadcasts of a series called Seventeen TV on the online streaming platform UStream. The show aired for multiple seasons, in which trainees were introduced and shown practicing for performances, with some seasons culminating with Like Seventeen concerts. Prior to their debut, Seventeen also appeared in the reality television show Seventeen Project: Big Debut Plan on MBC from May 2 to 26, 2015. The show concluded with the group's debut showcase.

2015: Successful debut, 17 Carat, and Boys Be

Seventeen officially debuted on May 26 with a live showcase televised by MBC, the first male K-pop group to debut with a one-hour live showcase on a major broadcasting channel, with labelmates Lizzy and Raina serving as MCs. Three days later, Seventeen's first extended play (EP) 17 Carat was released digitally. 17 Carat became the longest-charting K-pop album of the year in the US and was the only rookie album to appear on Billboard's "10 Best K-Pop Albums of 2015" list.

On September 10, 2015, Seventeen released their second EP Boys Be, which later became the highest-selling rookie album of the year. The EP's success earned the group awards at the Golden Disk Awards, Seoul Music Awards, and Gaon Chart K-Pop Awards. Seventeen became the only K-pop group on Billboard "21 Under 21 2015: Music's Hottest Young Stars" list. Seventeen held a four-show concert series in Seoul titled 2015 Like Seventeen – Boys Wish from December 24 to 26 as a year-end celebration. After the concerts' success, Seventeen held two more in the following February in 2016, the Like Seventeen – Boys Wish Encore Concert.

2016: Love & Letter, first win, and Going Seventeen
Seventeen's first studio album Love & Letter was released on April 25, 2016. In addition to success on domestic charts, the album charted on the Oricon Weekly Pop Album Chart in Japan. Seventeen received their first win on a domestic music show with the album's lead single "Pretty U". Love & Letter was later re-released on July 4 with lead single "Very Nice". Promotions were immediately followed by Seventeen's 1st Asia Tour 2016 Shining Diamonds, which included venues in South Korea, Japan, Singapore, Indonesia, Australia, and China. On December 5, the group released their third EP, Going Seventeen.

2017: Al1, first world tour and Teen, Age 

Seventeen embarked on a concert tour, 17 Japan Concert: Say The Name #Seventeen, in Japan between February 15 and 24, 2017. The shows attracted 50,000 spectators despite the group not having officially debuted in the country. On April 1, Seventeen became the first idol group to have a second season of the show One Fine Day, filming the series during their stay in Japan. The second season was titled One Fine Day in Japan and created in collaboration between South Korean broadcaster MBC and Japanese network Music On! TV.

Seventeen's fourth EP Al1 was released on May 22. It peaked at number one in South Korea and sold over 330,000 copies by the end of the year. The lead single "Don't Wanna Cry" became one of the group's most popular tracks, with its music video becoming Seventeen's first to reach 200 million views on YouTube. Later, a series of videos titled "2017 Seventeen Project" and three music videos subtitled "Chapter 0.5 Before AL1" were uploaded to the platform. The group completed their first world tour, 2017 Seventeen 1st World Tour "Diamond Edge", on October 6. The tour visited thirteen cities across Asia and North America. On November 6, the group released their second studio album, Teen, Age.

2018: Japanese debut, You Make My Day, and Ideal Cut tour
Seventeen released a special album on February 5, 2018, titled Director's Cut. Although it contained tracks from the original Teen, Age album, it was promoted as a special album instead of a repackaged one due to the addition of four new tracks, including lead single "Thanks". Five days later, Time magazine included Seventeen on their list of the six best K-pop groups to know. Seventeen officially debuted in Japan on May 30 with their first Japanese EP We Make You. They released their fifth Korean EP You Make My Day on July 16, their first to be certified platinum domestically. Promotions for the album took place in between the Ideal Cut tour concerts in Seoul and the tour shows in other Asian countries.

2019: You Made My Dawn, second world tour, and An Ode

Seventeen released their sixth EP You Made My Dawn on January 21, 2019. The lead single "Home" won ten trophies on weekly music shows: two triple crowns (achieving three consecutive wins on any one weekly music show) and a grand slam (winning trophies on Music Bank, Inkigayo, M Countdown, Show! Music Core, and Show Champion in a single promotion period). On May 29, Seventeen released their first Japanese single, "Happy Ending", which peaked at number one on the Oricon Daily Singles Chart and was certified platinum by the Recording Industry Association of Japan (RIAJ). On June 24, Seventeen announced their world tour Ode To You, with stops in Asia, North America, and Europe. The last leg of the tour was cancelled due to the COVID-19 pandemic in 2020. Seventeen released the digital single "Hit" on August 5, ahead of their upcoming third studio album An Ode on September 16. The album sold 700,000 copies in its first week and won the group their first Daesang (grand prize) for Album of the Year. It was also named the best K-pop album of the year by Billboard.

2020: International recognition, Heng:garæ, and Semicolon
On April 1, 2020, Seventeen released their second Japanese single "Fallin' Flower", which debuted atop on the Oricon Daily Singles Chart and sold more than 400,000 copies in its first week, securing first place on Billboard Japan Hot 100 Chart.

On May 13, Seventeen released the first installment of Hit The Road, a documentary series on their YouTube channel that follows the group behind the scenes during their Ode to You tour.

On June 22, Seventeen released their seventh EP, Heng:garæ. It sold one million copies in under one week, making Seventeen official "million sellers" and earning them certifications from both the Hanteo and Gaon charts. The album also charted well globally, reaching number one on iTunes Top Albums charts in 27 regions around the world. On July 7, Heng:garæ charted at number one on the Oricon Weekly Album Chart for a second week, making Seventeen the first international male artist to do so since the Backstreet Boys over 12 years ago.

On September 9, Seventeen released their second Japanese EP, 24H. They were the third group ever to reach number one on the Oricon Weekly Album Chart with four consecutive albums, a feat last achieved in 1977 by Scottish pop rock band Bay City Rollers. On October 9, 24H was certified platinum by the RIAJ for selling over 250,000 copies.

On October 19, Seventeen released their second special album Semicolon with lead single "Home;Run". The album made headlines before its release after it was reported that more than one million copies had been sold in pre-orders alone, the second of the group's albums to reach the one-million mark.

2021: US promotions, Not Alone, and "Power of Love" project
On January 6, 2021, Seventeen made their US television debut on CBS' The Late Late Show with James Corden, performing their single "Home;Run" from Semicolon. The performance video was released on the official YouTube channel and surpassed one million views in just one day. On January 13, Seventeen performed their song "Left & Right" from Heng:garæ on NBC's The Kelly Clarkson Show.

On April 21, Seventeen released their third Japanese single, "Not Alone". On May 14, the song was certified double-platinum by the RIAJ for selling over 500,000 copies. With "Not Alone", Seventeen became the first overseas male artist in history ever to surpass 200,000 first-week sales with three consecutive Japanese singles, from "Happy Ending" to "Not Alone". The song performed well on the Billboard Japan charts and placed first on the Oricon Daily and Weekly Singles Charts. It also charted first on iTunes songs charts in 10 regions around the world.

On May 18, Seventeen announced that they would be signing with Geffen Records and Universal Music Group for US and international distribution of their music.

Seventeen announced their "Power of Love" project, as well as the release of their eighth EP Your Choice on May 18 through a concept trailer video. For the first part of the project, Seventeen released a digital single performed by two members of their hip-hop unit, Wonwoo and Mingyu, titled "Bittersweet (feat. Lee Hi)", on May 28. The group's EP Your Choice was released on June 18.

On July 19, all members of Seventeen renewed their contracts with Pledis Entertainment.

On October 22, Seventeen released their ninth EP Attacca with lead single "Rock with You". Attacca sold two million copies, making it the group's first double million-selling album.

On December 8, Seventeen marked the end of their "Power of Love" project by releasing a special Japanese single of the same name, promoting a message of support and healing that the cold and difficult winter would end and spring would come with power of love.

2022–present: "Team SVT" project, Face the Sun, third world tour and Dream
On March 24, 2022, Seventeen announced their "Team SVT" project ahead of their sixth fan meeting, Seventeen in Caratland. They debuted a new group logo after the three-day event.

On April 15, Seventeen released an English-language digital single titled "Darl+ing" ahead of their fourth studio album, Face the Sun. The album was released on May 27 with the lead single "Hot". They also released their first film, Seventeen Power of Love: The Movie, in worldwide theaters on April 20 and 23 (excluding France and Japan, where it was released on April 21 and 29, respectively).

On May 7 and 8, 2022 Seventeen held their Japanese Fanmeeting 'Hanabi' at Saitama Super Arena, their first offline performance in the country in two and a half years since their Ode to You tour in 2019. That month, Pledis Entertainment announced that Seventeen would embark on their third world tour, Be the Sun, starting with the Gocheok Sky Dome in Seoul from June 25 to 26, 2022. The North American leg consisted of 12 shows in arenas across the US and Canada from August 10 to September 6. The group's label announced the addition of Asian shows in Jakarta, Bangkok, Manila, and Singapore from September 24 to October 13. In June 2022, the Japan leg for the Be the Sun tour was confirmed. The group performed six shows in domes across Japan, including Kyocera Dome Osaka, Tokyo Dome, and Vantelin Dome Nagoya in Aichi.

On July 18, 2022, Seventeen released the repackaged version of their fourth studio album, Sector 17, along with its lead single "_World". The remixed version of the song featured British singer Anne-Marie and was released on August 26. On November 9, Seventeen released their third Japanese EP Dream.

On December 10, Seventeen made their first appearance at an American festival, performing on the LA3C festival's main stage at Los Angeles State Historic Park. Pledis Entertainment announced two additional shows in Asia—December 17 at Philippine Arena and December 28 at Gelora Bung Karno Madya Stadium—making Seventeen the first K-pop acts to hold their own concerts in these venues.

Members

Hip-hop team
 S.Coups — group leader, hip-hop unit leader, rapper
 Wonwoo — rapper
 Mingyu — rapper
 Vernon — rapper

Vocal team
 Woozi — vocal unit leader, vocalist
 Jeonghan — vocalist
 Joshua — vocalist
 DK / Dokyeom — vocalist
 Seungkwan — vocalist

Performance team
 Hoshi — performance unit leader, dancer, vocalist, rapper 
 Jun — dancer, vocalist
 The8 — dancer, vocalist
 Dino — dancer, vocalist, rapper

Sub-units

Seventeen BSS
On March 21, 2018, members DK, Seungkwan, and Hoshi debuted as a sub-unit called BSS or BooSeokSoon, a nickname for the three members together. They released their first single "Just Do It" and promoted for a brief period. In January 2023, Pledis announced that BSS would return after five years of inactivity with their first single album Second Wind on February 6. It was released alongside the music video for its lead single, "Fighting", featuring Lee Young-ji. The album contains two other tracks, "Lunch" and "7PM", the latter featuring Norwegian artist Peder Elias. BSS earned their first ever music show award on February 15, 2023, with their lead single "Fighting", on the MBC M's Show Champion.

Awards and achievements

Seventeen have won numerous awards both in South Korea and internationally. The group earned their first-ever weekly music show win on May 4, 2016, with their single "Pretty U" on the Show Champion.

Seventeen won three rookie awards in their debut year and have since earned six Bonsang (main prize) and three Daesang (grand prize) awards from various year-end award shows. They also won the Best Dance Performance Award at the Mnet Asian Music Awards in 2017, 2018, and 2022.

On October 28, 2020, Seventeen received a Prime Minister's Commendation at the Korean Popular Culture and Arts Awards for their contribution to the development of South Korea's contemporary pop culture and arts. In September 2021, the group was awarded the Minister of Culture, Sports and Tourism Award at the 2021 Newsis Hallyu Expo. They were also nominated for Top Social Artist at the 2021 Billboard Music Awards.

Seventeen was the first-ever K-pop artist featured on both MTV Push, a global campaign curated by MTV’s music and talent teams in both the US and internationally, and MTV's "We Speak Music" campaign, which highlights artists who have shown the best performances on MTV under the theme of "Music as a universal language". At the 2022 MTV Video Music Awards, they were nominated for Best New Artist and Best K-Pop and won Push Performance of the Year. At the 2022 MTV Europe Music Awards, they were nominated for Best K-Pop and won Best Push Act and Best New Act. The group made history at both award shows as the first ever K-pop artist to be nominated and win these categories.

On December 9, 2022, Seventeen, alongside Hybe Chairman Bang Si-hyuk, received the Building K-cultural Bridges: Culture Ambassador Award at the Los Angeles LA3C festival at Hammer Museum. The group was recognized for their role in cultural exchanges between Korea, Asia, and the United States. On December 30, Seventeen won the Special International Music Award at the Japan Record Awards.

Artistry

Musical style
Since their debut, Seventeen have been heavily involved in their creative process and having a tight control over their music production. Woozi has written and produced each of their tracks, with contribution from other members, and their choreography has largely been created by performance team leader Hoshi. This has contributed to the group's distinctive musical style, with each comeback characterized by a new sound. Woozi explained in an interview with The Korean Herald , "Our participation ... went much further than just contributing our opinions. The leaders of the three unit groups went to every album production meeting to make sure that we could tell our own story."

Endorsements 
On October 13, 2016, Seventeen were appointed models for the American perfume brand Clean.

On January 9, 2017, DD Chicken announced that they selected Seventeen as their new models for the year.
In April 2017, Seventeen were chosen as new advertisement and marketing models for the uniform brand Elite, which announced that the group will start advertising and marketing activities as Elite models from the second half of the year.

On September 29, sports brand Dynafit announced that it selected Seventeen as models to introduce products such as training and daily wear for before and after exercise. On December 1, Global Eco cosmetic brand The Saem announced that Seventeen as its new advertising models to promote products such as the Urban Eco skincare series.

On August 31, 2018, Seventeen were selected as new advertising models for the outdoor lifestyle brand Lafuma. On November 1, Seventeen were selected as advertising models for the chicken franchise NeNe Chicken alongside labelmates NU'EST W.

On February 7, 2019, Seventeen were selected as advertising models for AO+ colored lenses, introducing special color lenses for each member. On September 23, Seventeen were chosen as Honorary Ambassadors for the Korea Brand & Content Expo 2019 in Dubai. On December 5, the group were appointed ambassadors for the COEX Winter Festival.

In 2020, Seventeen became the first Korean artists to work with designer Francesca Amfitheatrof. She launched her own brand, Thief and Heist, and chose Seventeen as her next partners.

On September 6, 2021, it was announced that Seventeen would be partnering with Cigna to help individuals accomplish their goals via the personal wellness coach TUNE H platform that provides exercise, nutrition, sleep, and mental care management to the younger generation. On October 19, Lazada named Seventeen as their first regional Happiness Ambassadors, ahead of its annual flagship 11.11 shopping festival. The group starred in Lazada's 11.11 film and performed at its virtual concert on November 10.

In April 2022, Seventeen collaborated with Apple to help global fans experience their music in more creative ways. The group kicked off the tech company’s Today At Apple sessions and become the first K-pop artist to participate in the remix session program to commemorate the opening of a new Apple store in Myeong-dong, South Korea and the release of Seventeen's digital single "Dar+ling" on April 15.

Philanthropy
Since their debut in 2015, Seventeen celebrates their anniversary by donating to charitable causes. In 2017, Seventeen participated in "Letters from Angels" as part of its 15th year anniversary; the adoption campaign, run by Korea's Social Welfare Society and photographer Seihon Cho, raises awareness for orphans and single mothers by displaying photos with celebrities to promote adoption.

On their third anniversary, Seventeen worked with 1st Look magazine to design and sell personalized T-shirts made by the members, donating proceeds to those in need.

Ahead of their fourth anniversary, Seventeen donated to a campaign by ChildFund Korea that provides housing support to children in need under the name of their fan club, Carat. Members Mingyu and Seungkwan personally designed the signboard that they also gave.

On their fifth anniversary, Seventeen donated to children and adolescents in need, specifically supporting education for the youth, including educational mentoring for children of multicultural families, scholarships, and cultural and arts education.

In 2020, Seventeen collaborated with jewelry designer Francesca Amfitheatrof and her brand Thief and Heist on a limited-edition eco-friendly bracelet called "The Tag". The bracelets were made of recycled plastic, and a portion of the proceeds was donated to the Plastic Bank organization to help preserve the environment.

On May 26, 2021, Pledis Entertainment revealed that the group made a donation to the international humanitarian non-governmental organization Good Neighbors in order to assist children who have been victims of abuse. Their donation helped fund the victims’ recovery and psychological treatment, in addition to supporting the improvement of their emotional stability and the restoration of their daily lives at home.

On May 26, 2022, Seventeen made donations to the underprivileged around the world to commemorate the seventh anniversary of their debut. The group's donation went to the UNESCO Korean National Commission's Global Education Sharing Project to help those such as children and teenagers in Africa and Asia receive an education.

"Going Together" campaign

In 2022, Seventeen launched a global campaign for the UNESCO Korean National Commission in support of a sustainable "future of education". On August 2, the Korean National Commission for UNESCO announced that it signed a business agreement with Pledis Entertainment to strengthen cooperation in education, including hosting the "Going Together" global campaign to encourage youth participation and interest. Through the campaign, Seventeen would promote the importance of education and encourage young people to participate in various educational activities to share the message of "Let's move forward together" for the future of sustainable education. The group expanded the campaign by donating part of the profits of their third world tour, Be the Sun, in addition to donations for the seventh anniversary of their debut.

In celebration of International Day of Education, on January 24, 2023, the Korean National Committee for UNESCO shared a new font inspired by Seventeen's mascot, Bongbongie, for a donation campaign running from January 24 to February 28. The font, made available for download after a minimum donation of $1.50 to UNESCO, "reflects 6-year old Bongbong’s newly-learned letters [and] symbolizes the importance of literacy and the joy of learning."

Discography

Korean albums
 Love & Letter (2016)
 Teen, Age (2017)
 An Ode (2019)
 Face the Sun (2022)

Filmography

Television shows

Online shows

Film

Concerts and tours

World tours
 Diamond Edge (2017)
 Ode to You (2019–2020)
 Be the Sun (2022)

Asia tours
 Shining Diamonds (2016)
 Ideal Cut (2018)

Japan tours
 Japan Arena Tour 'SVT' (2018)
 Japan Tour 'HARU' (2019)

Online concerts
 In-Complete (2021)
 Power of Love (2021)

References

External links

 

 
South Korean pop music groups
K-pop music groups
South Korean boy bands
Musical groups established in 2015
2015 establishments in South Korea
Pledis Entertainment artists
MAMA Award winners
Melon Music Award winners
South Korean hip hop groups
Hybe Corporation artists